Bradford South is a constituency represented in the House of Commons of the UK Parliament since 2015 by Judith Cummins of the Labour Party.

Constituency profile
The seat covers the southern suburbs of Bradford from Queensbury to Holmewood and has a large South Asian population.

Boundaries

1918–1950: The County Borough of Bradford wards of Great Horton, Lister Hills, Little Horton, North Bierley East, and North Bierley West.

1950–1955: The County Borough of Bradford wards of Clayton, Great Horton, Lister Hills, North Bierley West, and Thornton.

1955–1974: The County Borough of Bradford wards of Clayton, North Bierley East, North Bierley West, and West Bowling, and the Urban District of Queensbury and Shelf.

1974–1983: The County Borough of Bradford wards of Clayton, Great Horton, Odsal, Tong, Wibsey, and Wyke, and the Urban District of Queensbury and Shelf.

1983–2010: The City of Bradford wards of Great Horton, Odsal, Queensbury, Tong, Wibsey, and Wyke.

2010–present: The City of Bradford wards of Great Horton, Queensbury, Royds, Tong, Wibsey, and Wyke.

History
It was a Liberal-held seat from 1922 to 1924 and 1931–1945.  Since the 1945 general election Bradford South has returned Labour Party MPs,  although the Conservative Party came very close to gaining the seat in the 1980s.

Members of Parliament

Elections

Elections in the 2010s

Elections in the 2000s

Elections in the 1990s

Elections in the 1980s

Elections in the 1970s

Elections in the 1960s

Elections in the 1950s

Elections in the 1940s 

General Election 1939–40:

Another General Election was required to take place before the end of 1940. The political parties had been making preparations for an election to take place from 1939 and by the end of this year, the following candidates had been selected;
Liberal National: Herbert Holdsworth
Labour: Meredith Titterington
Liberal: Charles Ewart Hindley

Elections in the 1930s

Elections in the 1920s

Elections in the 1910s

See also 
 1994 Bradford South by-election
 1949 Bradford South by-election
 List of parliamentary constituencies in West Yorkshire

Notes

References

External links 
 nomis Constituency Profile for Bradford South — presenting data from the ONS annual population survey and other official statistics.

Parliamentary constituencies in Yorkshire and the Humber
Constituencies of the Parliament of the United Kingdom established in 1918
Politics of Bradford